IDEMIA is a multinational technology company headquartered in Courbevoie, France. It provides identity-related security services, and sells facial recognition and other biometric identification products and software to private companies and governments.

Corporate history

Morpho 
Morpho Systèmes was created in 1982, then absorbed by Sagem in 1993. In 2005, when Safran was created, Sagem became Sagem Défense Sécurité and in 2007, a separate company, Sagem Sécurité was created. It was renamed Morpho in 2010 (the name was derived from Morpho Systems S.A., a 1980s fingerprint identification firm), then Safran Identity & Security in 2016.

Morpho acquired several companies through its constitution. In 2005, Sagem Défense Sécurité acquired ORGA Kartensysteme GmbH which would be renamed Sagem Orga. In 2009, Safran acquired 81% of GE Homeland Protection, a wholly owned affiliate of the General Electric Company (NYSE:GE). On July 26, 2011 Safran completed the acquisition of L-1 Identity Solutions. Today, it is mainly part of MorphoTrust USA Inc. The company itself dates back over 50 years, from the time the first photo was added to a U.S. driver's license. In December 2015 Morpho (Safran) announced its acquisition of AirTag.

In the 2020 report Out of Control Amnesty International criticized Morpho for supplying "facial recognition equipment directly to the Shanghai Public Security Bureau in 2015."

Oberthur Technologies 
In 2007, the activities of Oberthur Card Systems, Oberthur Fiduciaire and Oberthur Cash Protection, companies initially originating from Imprimerie Oberthur, founded in 1842 in Rennes by François-Charles Oberthür, were merged into a single entity, Oberthur Technologies.

In September 2016, Safran announced that it had entered into exclusive negotiations with Advent International, the owner of Oberthur Technologies since 2011, to sell its identity and security activities and the transaction was finalized on 31 May 2017. Oberthur Technologies (OT) and Safran Identity & Security (Morpho) were joining forces to create OT-Morpho, then renamed as IDEMIA on September 28.

IDEMIA (since 2017)
The new company is specialized in biometric identification and security, as well as secure payments with the aim of converging technologies developed for the public sector (by the former Morpho) and those for the private sector (by Oberthur Technologies).

On 15 October 2018 Yann Delabrière replaced Didier Lamouche as President & CEO.

On 1 July 2020, Pierre Barrial was appointed as President & Chief Executive Officer of the Group; Yann Delabrière returned to his role as chairman of the board with effect from July 1, 2020.

IDEMIA has developed biometric bank cards where the PIN code is replaced by the user's fingerprint. Fingerprint technology is currently being tested internally by banking institutions  and would make it possible to secure contactless payment from the first euro. Fingerprint verification is done directly on the card and no fingerprint-related elements are transmitted to the merchant nor the bank.

In response to the growing demand from companies to use contactless access control devices to guarantee both a secure and hygienic method of identity verification, IDEMIA offers biometric terminals that use facial recognition or enable fingerprint recognition.

Areas of expertise

Identification 
This represents the company's historical core business. It develops the latest technologies in the field of  biometrics.

The facial recognition technologies proposed by IDEMIA allow for smooth passage through the airport or stadium entrances and are also used to spot people banned from the stadium, identify fugitives in crowds or check the identity of people entering reserved areas. The company has many references in the police field or in the civil field: United States, United Arab Emirates, Albania, or India with the Aadhaar project whose objective is to provide a unique 12-digit number to each Indian citizen after enrolment of their biometric data (iris, fingerprints, portrait for 1.3 billion people) allowing these citizens to open a bank account, access microcredit or receive social benefits.

IDEMIA produced 3 billion identity documents (passports, identity cards, driving licences, etc.) worldwide in 2020.

On the market of states and government services, IDEMIA participates in particular in the efforts of the United Nations Organisation to give everyone an identity by 2030 (in Africa or India, more than 1.1 billion people still do not have a legal existence).

Border Management 
Morpho was a specialist in airport border solutions, these solutions are now carried by IDEMIA. Based on biometrics (fingerprints, facial recognition or iris recognition), the company offers semi-automated or automated solutions that enable a person's biometrics to be associated with that of his or her identity document, such as the ID2Travel solution.

Singapore's Changi Airport, named the world's best airport seven times, has implemented biometric services provided by IDEMIA to identify and authenticate travelers as they pass through Terminals 3 and 4 of the airport. In Singapore, these services also equip Seletar airport and are also being adapted for other markets in the Asia-Pacific region.

Banking 
IDEMIA develops solutions to improve the payment card. Thus the company carries out research such as the implementation of fingerprint recognition in the 0.8 millimeter thickness of a card or the dynamic change the visual cryptogram. In addition, the company is able to manufacture custom cards in small series adapted to each of its customers, including cards made with recycled plastic.

Operations in the United States

IDEMIA provides products to various federal and state government entities in the United States and is the leading provider in the issuance of driver's licences.

IDEMIA owns IdentoGO, a company that operates hundreds of storefronts in the United States which offer "state-of-the-art electronic fingerprint capture capabilities as well as other identity-related products and services." IdentoGO is an authorized service provider for the United States federal government, and as such provides identity verification services for multiple Transportation Security Administration programs, including TSA PreCheck and the Transportation Worker Identification Credential.

IDEMIA's facial analysis technology has also been used by various entities across the United States:
In Florida, the Pinellas County Sheriff's Office has been using IDEMIA's software in their Face Analysis Comparison & Examination System (FACES) since 2001.
In Massachusetts, the Registry of Motor Vehicles has been using IDEMIA's face recognition technology to run scans against the database of driver's license photos since 2006.
In Arizona, the Department of Transportation implemented a mobile identification app with IDEMIA in 2021.

Concerns

Sharing sensitive biometric data 
Various civil rights organizations have criticized the government's contracts with IDEMIA, expressing concerns about sharing sensitive biometric data with a private and unregulated third-party company. Researchers have also found that facial verification and identification algorithms, including IDEMIA's algorithm specifically, exhibit systematic racial and gender bias. However, in April 2020 the NIST (National Institute of Standards and Technology), now part of the U.S. Department of Commerce, that provides technology, measurement, and standards that impact a wide range of products and technology, ranked IDEMIA 1st for iris recognition underlining its algorithms performance and accuracy.

Bribery 

Another concern is the former presence of Marwan Lahoud as a President or member of the board of different entities of the group, since 2017. He left the board on the 5th of November, 2018. Marwan Lahoud left abruptly AIRBUS (former EADS) in February 2017, without notice, and is deeply involved in the scandal of corruption which hit AIRBUS.

The Financial Times publishes an article on January 31, 2020 "Airbus ran 'massive' bribery scheme to win orders" in which he is mentioned, with a photo of him with this subtitle: "Marwan Lahoud, who led the strategy organization and marketing of Airbus, SMO, a division dedicated to securing sales in emerging markets and at the heart of a catalog of offenses." In January 2020, the French press announced that the French, British and American courts had validated the agreements made earlier this week by Airbus and the French National Financial Prosecutor's Office (PNF), the British Serious Fraud Office (SFO) and the Department of Justice ( DOJ) in the United States, under which the European group AIRBUS recognises the fraud and briberies, and undertakes to pay fines totalling 3.6 billion euros: 2.08 billion in France as part of a public interest legal agreement (CJIP ), 984 million in the United Kingdom and 526 million in the United States.

Today dissolved, the group's unit called Strategy and Marketing Organization (SMO), led by Marwan Lahoud, was at the heart of the matter. Almost all the articles published on these agreements underline that the ex-leaders may be worried within the framework of a preliminary investigation still in progress. The agreement, which also gives details on the corrupting and fraud mechanisms used in 20 corruption cases, was signed with the Serious Fraud Office and the DoJ.

In 2012, Safran (Sagem) was fined €50,000 by a French court for bribing public officials in Nigeria to win a €170 million contract in 2000/03 to produce identity cards.

Traces of "Russian hackers" 
In February 2015, the former top manager of the Safran Philippe Desbois and the head of another industrial company PowerJet Vincent Ascoet, who had lived and worked in Russia for a long time, appealed to the District Court for the Northern District of California. They filed a lawsuit against Safran and its subsidiary Morpho, claiming that Safran sold to US government agencies - and, in particular, the FBI - a fingerprint recognition system based on technologies of the Russian IT company Papilon. Russian code has been incorporated into Morpho's product to improve performance. According to sources, the code was acquired secretly, and the company deliberately hid this fact from the FBI, where this solution is used now.

The litigation lasted for several years, and in May 2019, the US Court of Appeals ruled to dismiss the claim.

References

External links
 Official website of IDEMIA (formerly known as Morpho)
 Official website of IdentoGO

Multinational companies headquartered in France
Companies based in Île-de-France